Wilfred J. Corrigan is a British engineer and entrepreneur, known for founding and running LSI Logic Corp. He was the chairman and chief executive of LSI for over two decades until 2005, during the earlier part of which he made vital contributions to the company. He was the founder and served twice as chairman of the Semiconductor Industry Association (SIA). Wilf is a veteran of Fairchild Semiconductor.

He was born in Liverpool, England, as the son of a dock worker, graduated with a degree in chemical engineering from the Imperial College of Science before starting his career at Motorola Semiconductor.  He later joined Fairchild Semiconductor, rising through the ranks to eventually become president and CEO for five years.  He left Fairchild in 1979 after selling the then ailing company to Schlumberger, an oilfield services firm.

As the founder of LSI Logic, Corrigan pioneered modern-day gate array, standard-cell application-specific integrated circuit (ASIC), system-on-a-chip and platform ASIC businesses. Before founding LSI Logic, Corrigan spearheaded the growth of Fairchild Camera and Instrument Corporation as chairman, president, and chief executive officer and earlier as its vice president and general manager of its Semiconductor Division. Corrigan is also an inventor and holds two U.S. patents related to field-effect device manufacturing and gas etching.

He is a recipient of the SIA's Robert N. Noyce Award, Semico Research's Bellwether Award and the Silicon Valley Leadership Group's Lifetime Achievement Award. He also is a member of the board of directors of the Semiconductor Industry Association, a Fellow of the Royal Academy of Engineering, Imperial College London and London's City and Guild Institute and a driving force in the establishment of the World Semiconductor Council.

External links
 Bio and photo, IEEE Robert N. Noyce Medal Recipient, 2005

Year of birth missing (living people)
Living people
British electrical engineers
American electrical engineers
Fellows of the Royal Academy of Engineering